Turbonilla sumneri is a species of sea snail, a marine gastropod mollusk in the family Pyramidellidae, the pyrams and their allies.

Distribution
This species occurs in the following locations:
 North West Atlantic

Notes
Additional information regarding this species:
 Distribution: Range: 41.5°N ; 70.7°W. Distribution: USA: Massachusetts

References

External links
 To Biodiversity Heritage Library (4 publications)
 To Encyclopedia of Life
 To USNM Invertebrate Zoology Mollusca Collection
 To ITIS
 To World Register of Marine Species

sumneri
Gastropods described in 1909